Our Immediate Task is an 1899 writing by Russian philosopher and revolutionary Vladimir Lenin. The article was a rebuttal to proponents of Economism. The South African newspaper Independent Online cited the work with reference to contemporary socialist movements in South Africa.

References

1899 essays
Works by Vladimir Lenin